The 1st congressional district of South Carolina is a coastal congressional district in South Carolina, represented by Republican Nancy Mace since January 3, 2021. She succeeded Democrat Joe Cunningham, having defeated him in the 2020 election. Cunningham was the first Democrat to represent the district since the 1980s.

The district has historically been based in Charleston. It has included Myrtle Beach, which became a major tourist destination in the late 20th century, as well as other coastal areas that have attracted retirees and seasonal visitors. From 1993 to 2013, the district boundaries extended from Seabrook Island in the south to the North Carolina border and included parts of Charleston, Dorchester, Berkeley and Georgetown counties and all of Horry County to the North Carolina line.

In 2010, the state received another seat in Congressional apportionment due to an increase in population. The state's districts had to be redrawn, which was completed in 2013. In the final plan, the 1st congressional district was redrawn to reach from Hilton Head to mid-coast South Carolina, ending at the Santee River and comprising parts of Charleston, Berkeley, Dorchester and Beaufort counties.  This configuration is similar to the one it had for most of the 20th century.  Horry County was included in the new 7th congressional district.

On January 6, 2023, the district was declared unconstitutional on account of racial gerrymandering and would have to be redrawn April of that year.

History 
Following the Civil War and granting of citizenship to former slaves, in 1870, Charleston's population was 53 percent black; and Charleston County had a 73 percent black majority. The city's large population of free people of color had developed many leaders who advanced in the changing society. These population majorities protected freedmen against some of the election-related violence that occurred in other parts of the state in the 1870s as white Democrats worked to suppress black voting and regain political control of the state. During Reconstruction, the mostly black Republicans from this district supported Republican candidates, including four terms for Joseph H. Rainey as US Representative to Congress, a record by an African-American legislator not surpassed until the 1950s.

After the Democrats regained control of the state in 1876, during an election season marked by violence and fraud, and Reconstruction ended in 1877, they passed laws establishing racial segregation and making voter registration and voting more difficult, such as the "eight-box law". African-American George W. Murray finally won in the disputed 1894 congressional election from this district; he challenged the Republican candidate's victory because of election fraud and was upheld by the House Committee on Elections. But passage of a new state constitution by Democrats in 1895 effectively disfranchised most African-American citizens in 1896. Their participation in the political system was ended for seven decades. The white Democrats established a one-party state and used various devices to maintain the exclusion of blacks until after passage of federal civil rights legislation in the mid-1960s.

Party realignments in the late 20th century resulted in many new black voters supporting the national Democratic Party. White conservatives in the South shifted and joined the Republican Party, in 1980 electing the first Republican congressman from the state to be elected in the 20th century. Since the buildup of the military in this region, especially the Navy, the area's white voters have supported conservative candidates.

Given the crippling of the Republican Party by the disfranchisement of blacks, a Republican was not elected to a full term in this district in the 20th century until 1980, when Tommy Hartnett was swept in by Reagan's coattails. But, his election represented a different party and was the result of a major realignment of white conservative voters in the late 20th century to the Republican, rather than the Democratic Party. Starting with national candidates in the late 1960s and 1970s, white voters in South Carolina began to shift to the Republican Party.

As after every decennial census, the state legislature conducted redistricting after the 1990 census. The white Republican-controlled legislature shifted most of Charleston's African-American majority areas into South Carolina's 6th congressional district, creating a majority-minority district.  To make up for the loss of population, the 1st was extended all the way up the Atlantic coast to Myrtle Beach. The 2010 redistricting cut the district back to the southeastern corner of the state.

Since that time, the 1st congressional district has had a majority-white population. But, in 2008, with the appeal of the Barack Obama presidential campaign, Democrat Linda Ketner came within two points of winning the 1st district congressional seat. In the following off-year election of 2010, Republican Tim Scott won the seat with 65 percent of the vote.

During the 2018 South Carolina primaries on June 12, 2018, Mark Sanford lost re-nomination to the seat. The Republicans would go on to lose the seat to the Democrats after the district swung heavily to the Democrats in the 2018 midterm elections.

2013 special election 

Tim Scott, a Republican from North Charleston, was elected as the 1st district's representative in 2010. He resigned after he was appointed by Governor Nikki Haley to the United States Senate when Jim DeMint resigned on January 1, 2013.

The district boundaries had been redrawn in 2011. A special election was held on May 7, 2013 to fill the vacancy created by Scott's resignation. In a Primary Election held on March 19, 2013, Elizabeth Colbert-Busch, the sister of comedian Stephen Colbert, won the Democratic nomination.  Former Governor Mark Sanford, who represented the district from 1995 to 2001, and former Charleston County Councilman Curtis Eilliott Bostic faced each other in a runoff Primary for the Republican nomination on April 2, 2013. Sanford won the nomination, and defeated challengers Colbert-Busch and South Carolina Green Party candidate Eugene Platt in the special election on May 7.

Counties 
Counties in the 2023-2025 district map.
 Beaufort County
 Berkeley County
 Charleston County (part)
 Colleton County (part)
 Dorchester County (part)
 Jasper County (part)

Election results from presidential races

List of members representing the district

Recent election results

2012

2013 special election

2014

2016

2018

2020

2022

See also

South Carolina's congressional districts
List of United States congressional districts

Notes

References

 Congressional Biographical Directory of the United States 1774–present

01
Berkeley County
Charleston County
Dorchester County
Georgetown County
Horry County